The rivalry between the Howard Bison and Morgan State Bears is a matchup between two HBCU schools, one of the oldest rivalries in black college football. The series started in 1899.

The Bison won the first game in 1899, 71 to 0. They continued to win—with the Bears scoring 0—until 1903, when the series stopped for 19 years. The series resumed in 1922, with the Bison winning by 50, though the Bears finally scoring its first points in the series. Another shutout win followed for the Bison in 1925. Eddie Hurt began coaching the Morgan State Bears in 1927, and for two years after, both teams tied with no score. The Bears first win against the Bison was in 1931. The Bison would only manage 4 wins and a tie from 1931 to 1979, then proceed to win 18 of the next 22 games from 1980 to 2001, and then only manage 3 wins from 2002 to 2016, before winning the last 5 games of the series from 2017 onwards. 

The rivalry is driven by several factors, which include the close proximity of their locations (DC-Baltimore). Roughly only 46 miles separate the nation’s top black educational institutes. The two schools compete in the Mid-Eastern Athletic Conference.

Game results

References

College football rivalries in the United States
Howard Bison football
Morgan State Bears football